Sir Hossein Yassaie FREng FIET is a British entrepreneur, global business leader and investor in technology sector. His work and focus have centred around new and transformational technologies and products. Among these were digital TV revolution, the enablement and rise of smart phones and more recently, next gen user interfaces/experiences and combating the new-age threat of internet mis/dis-information.

Currently he is actively involved in his portfolio of leading technology companies through board directorships, chairmanships, investments and advice. Among his portfolio companies are Mindtrace AI, Ultraleap, Yoto, Uniphy, Logically, Agile Analog, Mindtech, Kokoon, Luminary ROLI, Atomos and articulate.xyz

Previously Yassaie was the chief executive officer of Imagination Technologies where he worked from 1992 to 2016 and created one of the leading and most impactful UK-based technology businesses with its technologies enabling and powering many iconic brands.

Prior to Imagination he worked in senior technology and executive roles at Inmos (often recognised as the original cradle of the modern UK technology industry) and the leading European semiconductor company STMicroelectronics. Yassaie also chairs the not-for-profit industry and community association TechWorks whose stated mission is to strengthen the UK's deep tech capabilities as a global leader of future technologies. In addition to the technology companies, Yassaie has Unique Dining, a fine-dining experiential restaurant group, in his portfolio operating under Crockers Restaurants.

Education and early life
Yassaie came to Britain in 1976 from Iran and became a United Kingdom national in 1984. He studied Electronics and Communications at the University of Birmingham gaining a first class honours Bachelor of Science degree in 1979. He stayed at Birmingham to complete a Doctor of Philosophy degree in signal processing on the application of Charge-coupled devices (CCDs) to Sonar.

Career
Following his PhD, Hossein was a postdoctoral research fellow at the University of Birmingham for several years.

Yassaie then spent eight years working at STMicroelectronics and Inmos. During this time he was involved in the development and marketing of microprocessors, signal and video processors including the first digital TV chip. These activities ultimately resulted in a multi billion dollar semiconductor business unit at STMicroelectronics. He joined Imagination Technologies in 1992, becoming its CEO in June 1998 focusing the business on advanced technology development using the semiconductor intellectual property business model and created the brand Pure.

At Imagination Yassaie created a global business whose technology across graphics, video, processors and communication was annually powering well over one billion of new devices including iconic mobile phones, game consoles, TVs and cars.

Yassaie resigned his position as CEO of Imagination Technologies on 8 February 2016, amid board disagreement on future strategy at a time when global mobile phone market's slow-down started impacting short-term revenues. He was directing Imagination to build the next wave of technologies such as artificial intelligence and ray-tracing to ride out the short-term market conditions. However with pressure from some shareholders on short-term priorities and amidst strategic board disagreement he stepped down in February 2016. Yassaie's departure and the change of focus that followed over a few months triggered resignations of several other long-standing and experienced technology and business leaders from the company.

Yassaie now is chair/director/investor in several leading technology companies. His tech company portfolio includes Ultraleap, Yoto, Uniphy, Logically, Agile Analog, Mindtech, Kokoon, Luminary ROLI, Atomos and articulate.xyz. His technology and business areas of interests span from next-gen user interfaces, artificial intelligence(AI)/machine learning(ML) & next generation computing architectures, through smart systems for health and education/learning to the new critical area of internet mis/dis- information.

Yassaie also chairs the not-for-profit industry and community association TechWorks which operates as the UK's deep tech hub and whose stated mission is to strengthen the UK's deep tech capabilities as a global leader of future technologies. TechWorks operates by creating dynamic, connected technical and business communities to empower innovation and collaboration, identifying the critical common challenges and leading responses to tackle them and developing the UK tech ecosystem and partnerships across industry, academia and government to ensure the UK is amongst the best locations globally to start, build and scale technology businesses.

Beyond his technology portfolio, Sir Hossein is co-owner and chairman in an experiential fine-dining restaurant group, Unique Dining, which operates restaurants under Crockers Restaurants brand. Unique Dining currently operates Crockers Tring and Crockers Henley fine-dining restaurants.

Awards and honours
Yassaie received a knighthood in the 2013 New Year Honours in recognition of his services to technology and innovation.

He was awarded the honorary degree of DUniv by the University of Birmingham in 2013.

In November 2015 Sir Hossein received the Lifetime Achievement Award in The Annual Elektra

European Electronics Industry Awards Ceremony" Lifetime Achievement Award (2015)

In September 2016 he was elected a Fellow of the Institution of Engineering and Technology, FIET and also a Fellow of the Royal Academy of Engineering, FREng

In March 2022 Sir Hossein receives the Sunday Time's NED of the Year Award for Private & Private Equity Category NED Award 2022

Personal life 
Yassaie is married and has two daughters and two grandsons.

Passion and motivation 
Sir Hossein has always been keen on and passionate about UK standing and success on the global technology stage and has spoken publicly and written on related topics including: the need to encourage success/ambition, the importance of skills and young talent in tech, the need for an industrial strategy and UK technology sovereignty:<ref name=":4" /

 The Daily Telegraph article, April 2012 wrote: Hossein Yassaie likes the British under-dog mentality but thinks it is time success was communicated in a more positive way: "You go to USA and they are, maybe, over the top about the success, but in the UK success is not communicated as a positive thing. Even something positive has a sting in the tail" "I think it comes from the understated attitude of British people. Changing that needs everyone's participation".
 Daily Mail article, May 2012 wrote: When he gets most animated is talking about the need to energise British youngsters to become the next wave of technological entrepreneurs. Yassaie says: "There are not many children in UK that by the age of ten want to be technology rock starts." "A lot of them would like to be the next rock star or X-factor start or a football star. We go into the schools and tell them they could be the technology rock stars". "The talent is herein the UK – we have some of the best engineers – but linking them to the market and exploiting it is the key thing for us."
 From Sir Hossein's Linked-in Article "For the UK, as a historical & global society, there is no question that we should strongly maintain an open economy that welcomes foreign investment. However, it is also clear that our economic openness should not come at the expense of our nation's safety, security and/or prosperity. I certainly believe that we have, in the past, been a little too lax when it has come to balancing the economic openness with the required national safeguards. The horrendous COVID crisis has vividly demonstrated why we need to ensure certain key capabilities and technologies are native and adequately under our control. Also, a quick look back over the recent history suggests that we have quietly lost too many of our prized possessions in terms of world-leading businesses to overseas bidders!" Full Article "An open economy that protects our future too - my thoughts on the key principles relevant to the proposed UK's National Security Investment Bill"
 From Sir Hossein Linked-in Article "The national and international lockdown triggered by tragic COVID-19 tested many nations' internal readiness and capabilities to cope with an unprecedented event and in the case of the UK also reinforced the country's position as an island state. Like all families, we came to terms with the restrictions including travel and social distancing. Our island status also brings into sharp focus questions about which sovereign capabilities we really need and should therefore be considered as part of our national strategy" Full Article: "Automotive Electronics; A one-in-a-lifetime opportunity that UK must seize"

In his hospitality portfolio he has encouraged a company culture and approach different to what is norm in this sector with some elements and learnings borrowed from the tech sector with a focus on purpose, values,  people and their career.

References

Living people
Iranian emigrants to the United Kingdom
British businesspeople
Alumni of the University of Birmingham
Fellows of the Royal Academy of Engineering
Knights Bachelor
Year of birth missing (living people)